The Recruit is a 2003 American spy thriller film, directed by Roger Donaldson and starring Al Pacino, Colin Farrell, and Bridget Moynahan. It was produced by Epsilon Motion Pictures and released in North America by Touchstone Pictures on January 31, 2003, receiving mixed reviews from critics and grossing $101 million worldwide.

Plot 
James Clayton is a prodigious programmer studying nonlinear cryptography at MIT, collaborating with a group of peers to create Spartacus, a surveillance program that can enslave any computer's audiovisual hardware to the master computer via the internet. His group showcases the software to Dell at a campus fair drawing substantial interest in its uses.

Later at his night job, James is approached by Walter Burke, a man who claims to have known James’ deceased father and suggests he works for the Central Intelligence Agency. After a pitch to recruit James into the agency, James initially declines until he reconsiders it as an opportunity to get answers to his father's mysterious plane crash in Peru several years earlier.

James passes the initial security screening and is bussed with the rest of his class to The Farm in rural Virginia where they undergo training as potential operatives. While there, James develops an attraction to Layla Moore and a rivalry with Zack who is James’ competition for top of the class.

One night during a training exercise in which James and Layla are paired together to tail a mark, they are abducted by masked assailants and imprisoned where they are tortured psychologically and physically for several days. Their interrogators wish to know what happens at The Farm and the names of those who teach there. After resisting for days, James breaks when he's told about Layla's brutal treatment. He reveals Burke's name, at which point it's revealed that the whole experience was part of the exercise that the class was observing, including Layla, and that James failed by breaking. He is then attritted from the Farm.

Later, Burke seeks out a despondent James and informs him that his discharge was part of a cover story because he's been selected as a non-official cover operative, or “NOC”. He gives James a low-level data entry position at the Agency (on the basis that his progress at the Farm was sufficient for this work) so he can get close to Layla who has graduated from the Farm and now holds a higher position than James. Burke explains that Layla is suspected of working with foreign agents to steal CIA secrets, specifically a highly sensitive computer virus called "ICE-9" because it transmits via the electrical grid rather than telecommunications and is easily capable of disabling all electrical devices on the planet instantly, thus behaving similarly to the particle from the Kurt Vonnegut novel Cat's Cradle.

James reunites with Layla and the two begin a romantic relationship. While staying overnight at her home, he checks her laptop for evidence of her crimes and she plants a bug on the lapel of his winter coat. Later, he witnesses her making a dead drop at Union Station and follows the mysterious agent who retrieves what Layla left behind. 
The two end up in a shootout on the train tracks and the agent, who is revealed to be Zack, is killed.

Believing both of them to be traitors, James confronts Layla who tells him that Zack was the NOC, not him, and that she was tasked with assessing the security protocols of the CIA headquarters because it was feared that someone else was stealing CIA material.

James then goes to a meet with Burke wherein he confronts Burke about what's really happening. Burke claims that Zack's death was faked, that the gun Burke gave James is loaded with non-lethal ammunition, and that everyone is intending to rendezvous for debrief momentarily. However, Burke catches James off guard and shoots at him, narrowly missing him but blowing out the rear window of his vehicle in the process, proving that the gun was in fact loaded with live ammunition and therefore Zack is indeed dead.

Burke pursues James through the abandoned warehouse they were parked outside of, explaining to James along the way why he set up the elaborate lie to implicate them and cover up his own crimes of selling Agency secrets to foreign governments. James meanwhile has set up a laptop running Spartacus though it failed to connect, however he leads Burke to believe it successfully transmitted his confession back to the Agency and he's now incriminated for everything. Burke angrily destroys the laptop and pursues James outside of the warehouse where a CIA strike team led by Dennis Slayne, another Farm instructor, is waiting. Burke launches into a tirade, airing his grievances against the Agency, believing that he was never appreciated for all the sacrifices he made in his career. Slayne realizes that Burke is the one they're looking for and directs the strike team to target Burke to take into custody, revealing they were originally there to arrest James.

Realizing now that he really is incriminated, Burke refuses to be taken into custody and instead raises his empty gun at the strike team who quickly shoot and kill him. Slayne then drives James back to headquarters for a debrief, cryptically mentioning along the way that James was meant to be in that line of work because “it’s in [his] blood” suggesting his father in fact worked for the agency, despite Burke's earlier denial of such.

Cast
 Colin Farrell as James Douglas Clayton
 Al Pacino as CIA Officer Walter Burke
 Bridget Moynahan as CIA Officer Layla Moore
 Gabriel Macht as CIA Officer Zack
 Kenneth Mitchell as Alan
 Karl Pruner as CIA Agent Dennis Slayne
 Mike Realba as Ronnie Gibson
 Elisa Moolecherry as Lisa Sahadi
 Merwin Mondesir as Stan
 Sam Kalilieh as Elliot
 Chris Owens as Art Wallis
 Richard Fitzpatrick as Rob Stevens
 Ron Lea as Bill Rudolph, Dell Rep.
 Tova Smith as Beth
 Michael Rubenfeld as Felix

Production
The film was produced by Gary Barber's and Roger Birnbaum's production company Spyglass Entertainment, with financial support from Disney's Touchstone Pictures and German film financing company Epsilon Motion Pictures (which was owned by the Kirch Group at the time). Filming began on December 3, 2001. It was mainly filmed in Toronto and Niagara-on-the-Lake in Canada, with some landmark scenes, such as that from the Iwo Jima Memorial by the Arlington National Cemetery, shot in and around Washington, D.C. The film's working title was The Farm. James Foley was considered to direct, but was replaced by Donaldson before filming began.

Reception

Box office
The film was released on January 31, 2003, and earned $16.3 million in its first weekend. Its final gross was $52.8 million in the United States and $48.4 million internationally, for a total of $101.2 million.

Critical response
On review aggregator Rotten Tomatoes the film holds an approval rating of 43% based on 167 reviews, with an average rating of 5.55/10. The website's critics consensus states: "This polished thriller is engaging until it takes one twist too many into the predictable." Metacritic assigned the film a weighted average score of 56 out of 100, based on 36 critics, indicating "mixed or average reviews". Audiences polled by CinemaScore gave the film an average grade of "B+" on an A+ to F scale.

Owen Gleiberman of Entertainment Weekly gave the film a positive review, with a B+ score. He wrote, "From the get-go, The Recruit is one of those thrillers that delights in pulling the rug out from under you, only to find another rug below that." Carla Meyer of San Francisco Chronicle also gave a positive review to the film, stating, "Pacino and Farrell bring a wary curiosity to their early scenes, with Farrell displaying a palpable hunger for praise and Pacino a corresponding mastery of how to hook somebody by parceling out compliments. They're a swarthier version of Robert Redford and Brad Pitt in Spy Game–only The Recruit is more about mind games."

Todd McCarthy of Variety stated, "The whole picture may be hokey, but the first part is agreeably so, the second part not. At the very least, one comes away with a new appreciation of the difficulty of interoffice romance at the CIA." Mike Clark of USA Today gave a mixed review to the film, stating, "Nothing is ever what it seems, but still, nothing's very compelling in The Recruit, a less-than-middling melodrama whose subject matter and talent never click as much as its credits portend."

CIA reaction
In 2009, the movie was reviewed by new CIA employees, who wrote that although "everyone in the Agency believes the movie is ridiculous", the movie is "entertaining" and that "all of the covert service trainees watched the film on the bus going into training" for "comic relief".

According to T.J. Waters (a former Farm student), The Recruit is "a mediocre movie" in which he "recognize[s] a lot of similarities with the real Farm".

References

External links
 
 
 
 
 

2003 films
2000s spy thriller films
American spy thriller films
Films about the Central Intelligence Agency
Films directed by Roger Donaldson
Films produced by Roger Birnbaum
Films scored by Klaus Badelt
Films shot in Toronto
Films shot in Virginia
Films with screenplays by Kurt Wimmer
Films with screenplays by Mitch Glazer
Spyglass Entertainment films
Techno-thriller films
Touchstone Pictures films
2000s English-language films
2000s American films